James F. Penders is the coach of the UConn Huskies baseball team. Penders began his time with the Huskies in 1991 as a player on the varsity team. In his senior year, he was named a co-captain and helped to lead the Huskies to victory in the 1994 Big East Conference baseball tournament. Penders was named an assistant coach of the Huskies in 1997 and became head coach after the 2003 season.

Playing years
Penders was a co-captain in 1994. Penders finished the season batting .354 with seven home runs and 46 RBIs.

Coaching career
Penders was hired as a graduate assistant baseball coach before being named a full assistant in 1999. He was promoted to head coach in 2003 after Andy Baylock left the program. Penders won the Big East Coach of the Year honors in 2006, 2010 and 2011, taking the Huskies to the NCAA tournament in each of those three seasons. In 2011, Penders led the Huskies to their first Super Regional. They were eliminated by South Carolina, two games to none. On March 27, 2012, Penders earned his 300th career victory, all at Connecticut, with a win over in-state rival Hartford.  The 8th-seeded Huskies won the 2013 Big East Conference baseball tournament in the league's final year before the split.

Head coaching record

Personal life
Penders' father, Jim Penders, Sr., also played baseball at the University of Connecticut and was a member of the Huskies team that played in the 1965 College World Series. Penders, Sr. was the head baseball coach at East Catholic High School from 1969 to 2012 and won four state championships.

His brother, Rob Penders, played for the Richmond Roosters of the Frontier League in 1996. He is the current head baseball coach at St. Edwards University.

His grandfather, Jim, was the head baseball coach at Stratford High School from 1931 to 1968 and won four state championships.

His uncle, Tom Penders, served as the head basketball coach at Tufts University, Columbia University, Fordham University, the University of Rhode Island, University of Texas at Austin, George Washington University and the University of Houston.

From 1994–1996, Penders lived in Washington, D.C. where he worked as a political fundraiser for Senator Tom Harkin of Iowa.

Penders and his wife, Brooke, reside in Old Wethersfield. They have three children.

See also
 List of current NCAA Division I baseball coaches

References

Living people
UConn Huskies baseball players
UConn Huskies baseball coaches
People from Vernon, Connecticut
People from Wethersfield, Connecticut
Baseball coaches from Connecticut
Year of birth missing (living people)